"Get Free" is a song by American singer and songwriter Lana Del Rey from her fifth studio album, Lust for Life (2017). The song was written by Del Rey, Rick Nowels, and Kieron Menzies, all of whom produced the song with Dean Reid. Del Rey performed the song various times, most notably on her LA to the Moon Tour in 2018.

In January 2018, Del Rey confirmed speculation that Radiohead had filed a copyright lawsuit against her and her team for alleged similarities between "Get Free" and their hit song, "Creep".

Background
According to Del Rey, the song was originally recorded under the title "Malibu" and was completely different in the original recording, being far more revealing about Del Rey and her life over the past 6 years. Evidently, Del Rey scrapped that version of the song and decided to make a lighter record out of the original instrumental. During a 2018 interview for World Cafe, Del Rey shared the sentiment behind the song: "It's about people who don't get to reach their full potential because they let controlling people stop them from being free."

Radiohead lawsuit
In January 2018, Del Rey said on Twitter that the band Radiohead were taking legal action against her for allegedly plagiarising their 1992 song "Creep" on "Get Free". According to Del Rey, Radiohead asked for 100% of publishing royalties instead of Del Rey's offer of 40%. She denied that "Creep" had inspired "Get Free". Radiohead's publisher Warner/Chappell Music confirmed it was seeking songwriting credit for "all writers" of "Creep", but denied that a lawsuit had been brought or that Radiohead had demanded 100% of royalties. In March, Del Rey told an audience that "my lawsuit's over, I guess I can sing that song any time I want". The writing credits for "Get Free" were not updated on the database of the American Society of Composers, Authors, and Publishers.

In an analysis, The Guardian found that the chords used in "Creep" were rare in pop music and that the melodies bore an "uncanny resemblance". Publications compared it to the dispute of similarities between TLC's "No Scrubs" and Ed Sheeran's "Shape of You" and the Marvin Gaye estate's lawsuit with Pharrell Williams and Robin Thicke over similarities between "Blurred Lines" and Gaye's "Got to Give It Up". Prior to the suit, Radiohead were sued over "Creep"'s similarity to the 1972 song "The Air That I Breathe", written by Albert Hammond and Mike Hazlewood; Hammond and Hazlewood received cowriting credits and a percentage of the royalties.

Music video
No video for the song was ever made, though a snippet of the song was featured in the Rich Lee-directed video for "White Mustang".

Credits and personnel
Credits adapted from the liner notes of Lust for Life.

Performance
 Lana Del Rey – primary artist

Instruments
 Lana Del Rey – production
 Rick Nowels – bass, keyboards, synth pads, organs
 Kieron Menzies – tape loops, percussion, synthesizer
 Dean Reid – electric guitar, synth bass
 Zac Rae – synthesizer, organ, Mellotron, guitar
 Mighty Mike – drums, percussion
 David Levita – electric guitar
 Trevor Yasuda – keyboards
 Aaron Sterling – live drums, percussion

Engineering
 Kieron Menzies – production, engineering, mixing
 Dean Reid – production, engineering, mixing
 Trevor Yasuda – engineering
 Chris Garcia – engineering
 Adam Ayan – mastering

Charts

References

2017 songs
Lana Del Rey songs
Radiohead
Songs involved in plagiarism controversies
Songs written by Lana Del Rey
Songs written by Rick Nowels